Snowman is the first special album by the South Korean girl group April. This marks their first winter album release.

Background and release
On December 10th, it was announced that the group would release a special winter single album titled Snowman on December 21st, and posted puzzle teaser images to the group's Facebook, Twitter, Instagram, and Fan cafe. On December 31, a special choreography music video for "Snowman" was posted on the group's official YouTube channel.

Track listing

References

2015 singles
April (girl group) songs